Owen Lewis (born 1 October 1988) is a Welsh rugby league footballer who has gained Under 18 and Under 19 international honours representing his country and also Great Britain.

Having played for Valley Cougars, he made his début for Crusaders rugby league team in 2007 and played one further match for them in the same season before leaving the club to study at university.

He is studying at Loughborough University, for whom he plays Rugby Union in National League 2 North as at 2010–2011.

Notes 

Alumni of Loughborough University
1988 births
Living people